A network video recorder (NVR) is a specialized computer system that includes a software program that records video in a digital format to a disk drive, USB flash drive,  SD memory card or other mass storage device. An NVR contains no dedicated video capture hardware. However, the software is typically run on a dedicated device, usually with an embedded operating system. Alternatively, to help support increased functionality and serviceability, standard operating systems are used with standard  processors and video management software.  An NVR is typically deployed in an IP video surveillance system.

Network video recorders are distinct from digital video recorders (DVR) as their input is from a network rather than a direct connection to a video capture card or tuner. Video on a DVR is encoded and processed at the DVR, while video on an NVR is encoded and processed at the camera, then streamed to the NVR for storage or remote viewing.
Additional processing may be done at the NVR, such as further compression or tagging with meta data.

Hybrid NVR/DVR surveillance systems exist which incorporate functions of both NVR and DVR; these are considered a form of NVR.

See also 
 Video management system
 Closed-circuit television (CCTV)
 Closed-circuit television camera
 Digital video recorder
 List of free television software
 Motion 
 ZoneMinder, a free closed-circuit television software application

References 

Video hardware
Digital video recorders
Video surveillance 

ru:Видеорегистратор#Сетевые видеорегистраторы (NVR)